The Old Melbourne Beach Town Hall is a historic building currently located at 2372 Oak Street, Melbourne Beach, Florida, United States.  This building was built in 1908 at Ryckman Park as the offices of the Melbourne Beach Improvement Company.  The building was moved to its present location in 1953 and it currently houses the Old Town Hall History Center.

Old Town Hall History Center
The Old Town Hall History Center is a museum located in the Old Melbourne Beach Town Hall building.  The museum contains exhibits on the history of the local area, including Ais Indians, Spanish shipwrecks and the development of Melbourne Beach.

References

External links

Old Town Hall History Center - Visiting information, look under Old Town Hall

Buildings and structures in Brevard County, Florida
History museums in Florida
Melbourne Beach, Florida
Museums in Brevard County, Florida